Evan Taylor (born 25 January 1989 in Jamaica) is a Jamaican footballer who currently plays for Mount Pleasant Football Academy.

Career

Club
Taylor attended and played soccer at Godfrey Stewart High School in Jamaica, and started his club career at Reno of the Jamaica National Premier League where, under the tutelage of former Jamaica national team player and coach, Wendell Downswell, he plays for under-21 and senior teams. In 2009, Taylor went on loan to the Vancouver Whitecaps Residency during the DPL off-season.  Following a strong season in Reno's return to Jamaica's top flight in 2010–2011, Taylor was signed by Charleston Battery of the American USL Pro league on 16 March 2011.

Taylor joined Harbour View F.C. for a season long loan in 2012, where he led them to the RSPL title. Taylor spent 2013–2014 on loan once again to Montego Bay United F.C.   In August 2014, Taylor moved to Waterhouse F.C.

In August 2018, Evan Taylor joined Mount Pleasant Football Academy in the RSPL.

International
Evan Taylor was given his senior national team debut by Rene Simoes in 2008 World Cup qualifiers. Taylor also played on Jamaica's 2009 U20 squad.

Honours

Reno
Western Confederation Super League:
Winner (1): 2010

Harbour View
Jamaica National Premier League:
 Winner (1): 2013

References

External links

Evan Taylor Profile

1989 births
Living people
Jamaican footballers
Jamaica international footballers
Vancouver Whitecaps Residency players
Charleston Battery players
USL League Two players
USL Championship players
Expatriate soccer players in Canada
Expatriate soccer players in the United States
Harbour View F.C. players
Association football midfielders
National Premier League players
Mount Pleasant Football Academy players
2009 CONCACAF U-20 Championship players
People from Westmoreland Parish